Californium is a radioactive chemical element with the symbol Cf and atomic number 98. The element was first synthesized in 1950 at Lawrence Berkeley National Laboratory (then the University of California Radiation Laboratory), by bombarding curium with alpha particles (helium-4 ions). It is an actinide element, the sixth transuranium element to be synthesized, and has the second-highest atomic mass of all elements that have been produced in amounts large enough to see with the naked eye (after einsteinium). The element was named after the university and the U.S. state of California.

Two crystalline forms exist for californium at normal pressure: one above and one below . A third form exists at high pressure. Californium slowly tarnishes in air at room temperature. Californium compounds are dominated by the +3 oxidation state. The most stable of californium's twenty known isotopes is californium-251, with a half-life of 898 years. This short half-life means the element is not found in significant quantities in the Earth's crust. 252Cf, with a half-life of about 2.645 years, is the most common isotope used and is produced at Oak Ridge National Laboratory in the United States and Research Institute of Atomic Reactors in Russia.

Californium is one of the few transuranium elements with practical applications. Most of these applications exploit the property of certain isotopes of californium to emit neutrons. For example, californium can be used to help start up nuclear reactors, and it is employed as a source of neutrons when studying materials using neutron diffraction and neutron spectroscopy. Californium can also be used in nuclear synthesis of higher mass elements; oganesson (element 118) was synthesized by bombarding californium-249 atoms with calcium-48 ions. Users of californium must take into account radiological concerns and the element's ability to disrupt the formation of red blood cells by bioaccumulating in skeletal tissue.

Characteristics

Physical properties 
The pure metal is malleable and is easily cut with a razor blade. Californium metal starts to vaporize above  when exposed to a vacuum. Below  californium metal is either ferromagnetic or ferrimagnetic (it acts like a magnet), between 48 and 66 K it is antiferromagnetic (an intermediate state), and above  it is paramagnetic (external magnetic fields can make it magnetic). It forms alloys with lanthanide metals but little is known about the resulting materials.

The element has two crystalline forms at standard atmospheric pressure: a double-hexagonal close-packed form dubbed alpha (α) and a face-centered cubic form designated beta (β). The α form exists below 600–800 °C with a density of 15.10 g/cm3 and the β form exists above 600–800 °C with a density of 8.74 g/cm3. At 48 GPa of pressure the β form changes into an orthorhombic crystal system due to delocalization of the atom's 5f electrons, which frees them to bond.

The bulk modulus of a material is a measure of its resistance to uniform pressure.

Chemical properties and compounds 

Californium exhibits oxidation states of 4, 3, or 2. It typically forms eight or nine bonds to surrounding atoms or ions. Its chemical properties are predicted to be similar to other primarily 3+ valence actinide elements and the element dysprosium, which is the lanthanide above californium in the periodic table. Compounds in the +4 oxidation state are strong oxidizing agents and those in the +2 state are strong reducing agents.

The element slowly tarnishes in air at room temperature, with the rate increasing when moisture is added. Californium reacts when heated with hydrogen, nitrogen, or a chalcogen (oxygen family element); reactions with dry hydrogen and aqueous mineral acids are rapid. 

Californium is only water-soluble as the californium(III) cation. Attempts to reduce or oxidize the +3 ion in solution have failed. The element forms a water-soluble chloride, nitrate, perchlorate, and sulfate and is precipitated as a fluoride, oxalate, or hydroxide. Californium is the heaviest actinide to exhibit covalent properties, as is observed in the californium borate.

Isotopes 

Twenty isotopes of californium are known (mass number ranging from 237 to 256); the most stable are 251Cf with half-life 898 years, 249Cf with half-life 351 years, 250Cf with half-life 13.08 years, and 252Cf with half-life 2.645 years. All other isotopes have half-life shorter than a year, and most of these have half-life less than 20 minutes.

249Cf is formed from beta decay of berkelium-249, and most other californium isotopes are made by subjecting berkelium to intense neutron radiation in a nuclear reactor. Though californium-251 has the longest half-life, its production yield is only 10% due to its tendency to collect neutrons (high neutron capture) and its tendency to interact with other particles (high neutron cross section).

Californium-252 is a very strong neutron emitter, which makes it extremely radioactive and harmful. 252Cf, 96.9% of the time, alpha decays to curium-248; the other 3.1% of decays are spontaneous fission. One microgram (μg) of 252Cf emits 2.3 million neutrons per second, an average of 3.7 neutrons per spontaneous fission. Most other isotopes of californium, alpha decay to curium (atomic number 96).

History 

Californium was first made at University of California Radiation Laboratory, Berkeley, by physics researchers Stanley Gerald Thompson, Kenneth Street Jr., Albert Ghiorso, and Glenn T. Seaborg, about February 9, 1950. It was the sixth transuranium element to be discovered; the team announced its discovery on March 17, 1950.

To produce californium, a microgram-size target of curium-242 was bombarded with 35 MeV alpha particles in the  cyclotron at Berkeley, which produced californium-245 plus one free neutron.

  +  →  + 
To identify and separate out the element, ion exchange and adsorsion methods were undertaken. Only about 5,000 atoms of californium were produced in this experiment, and these atoms had a half-life of 44 minutes.

The discoverers named the new element after the university and the state. This was a break from the convention used for elements 95 to 97, which drew inspiration from how the elements directly above them in the periodic table were named. However, the element directly above #98 in the periodic table, dysprosium, has a name that means "hard to get at", so the researchers decided to set aside the informal naming convention. They added that "the best we can do is to point out [that] ... searchers a century ago found it difficult to get to California".

Weighable amounts of californium were first produced by the irradiation of plutonium targets at Materials Testing Reactor at National Reactor Testing Station, eastern Idaho; these findings were reported in 1954. The high spontaneous fission rate of californium-252 was observed in these samples. The first experiment with californium in concentrated form occurred in 1958. The isotopes 249Cf to 252Cf were isolated that same year from a sample of plutonium-239 that had been irradiated with neutrons in a nuclear reactor for five years. Two years later, in 1960, Burris Cunningham and James Wallman of Lawrence Radiation Laboratory of the University of California created the first californium compounds—californium trichloride, californium(III) oxychloride, and californium oxide—by treating californium with steam and hydrochloric acid.

The High Flux Isotope Reactor (HFIR) at Oak Ridge National Laboratory (ORNL) in Oak Ridge, Tennessee, started producing small batches of californium in the 1960s. By 1995, HFIR nominally produced  of californium annually. Plutonium supplied by the United Kingdom to the United States under the 1958 US–UK Mutual Defence Agreement was used for making californium.

Californium metal was first prepared in 1974 by Haire and Baybarz, who reduced californium(III) oxide with lanthanum metal to obtain microgram amounts of sub-micrometer thick films.

Occurrence 
Traces of californium can be found near facilities that use the element in mineral prospecting and in medical treatments. The element is fairly insoluble in water, but it adheres well to ordinary soil; and concentrations of it in the soil can be 500 times higher than in the water surrounding the soil particles.

Nuclear fallout from atmospheric nuclear weapons testing prior to 1980 contributed a small amount of californium to the environment. Californium isotopes with mass numbers 249, 252, 253, and 254 have been observed in the radioactive dust collected from the air after a nuclear explosion. Californium is not a major radionuclide at United States Department of Energy legacy sites since it was not produced in large quantities.

Californium was once believed to be produced in supernovas, as their decay matches the 60-day half-life of 254Cf. However, subsequent studies failed to demonstrate any californium spectra, and supernova light curves are now thought to follow the decay of nickel-56.

The transuranium elements from americium to fermium, including californium, occurred naturally in the natural nuclear fission reactor at Oklo, but no longer do so.

Spectral lines of californium, along with those of several other non-primordial elements, were detected in Przybylski's Star in 2008.

Production 

Californium is produced in nuclear reactors and particle accelerators. Californium-250 is made by bombarding berkelium-249 with neutrons, forming berkelium-250 via neutron capture (n,γ) which, in turn, quickly beta decays (β−) to californium-250 in the following reaction:
(n,γ) →  + β−
Bombardment of californium-250 with neutrons produces californium-251 and californium-252.

Prolonged irradiation of americium, curium, and plutonium with neutrons produces milligram amounts of californium-252 and microgram amounts of californium-249. As of 2006, curium isotopes 244 to 248 are irradiated by neutrons in special reactors to produce primarily californium-252 with lesser amounts of isotopes 249 to 255.

Microgram quantities of californium-252 are available for commercial use through the U.S. Nuclear Regulatory Commission. Only two sites produce californium-252: the Oak Ridge National Laboratory in the United States, and the Research Institute of Atomic Reactors in Dimitrovgrad, Russia. As of 2003, the two sites produce 0.25 grams and 0.025 grams of californium-252 per year, respectively.

Three californium isotopes with significant half-lives are produced, requiring a total of 15 neutron captures by uranium-238 without nuclear fission or alpha decay occurring during the process. Californium-253 is at the end of a production chain that starts with uranium-238, includes several isotopes of plutonium, americium, curium, berkelium, and the californium isotopes 249 to 253 (see diagram).

Applications 

Californium-252 has a number of specialized uses as a strong neutron emitter; it produces 139 million neutrons per microgram per minute. This property makes it useful as a startup neutron source for some nuclear reactors and as a portable (non-reactor based) neutron source for neutron activation analysis to detect trace amounts of elements in samples. Neutrons from californium are used as a treatment of certain cervical and brain cancers where other radiation therapy is ineffective. It has been used in educational applications since 1969 when Georgia Institute of Technology got a loan of 119 μg of 252Cf from the Savannah River Site. It is also used with online elemental coal analyzers and bulk material analyzers in the coal and cement industries.

Neutron penetration into materials makes californium useful in detection instruments such as fuel rod scanners; neutron radiography of aircraft and weapons components to detect corrosion, bad welds, cracks and trapped moisture; and in portable metal detectors. Neutron moisture gauges use 252Cf to find water and petroleum layers in oil wells, as a portable neutron source for gold and silver prospecting for on-the-spot analysis, and to detect ground water movement. The main uses of 252Cf in 1982 were, reactor start-up (48.3%), fuel rod scanning (25.3%), and activation analysis (19.4%). By 1994, most 252Cf was used in neutron radiography (77.4%), with fuel rod scanning (12.1%) and reactor start-up (6.9%) as important but secondary uses. In 2021, fast neutrons from 252Cf were used for wireless data transmission.

The low critical mass of californium led to some exaggerated claims about possible uses for the element.

In October 2006, researchers announced that three atoms of oganesson (element 118) had been identified at Joint Institute for Nuclear Research in Dubna, Russia, from bombarding 249Cf with calcium-48, making it the heaviest element ever made. The target contained about 10 mg of 249Cf deposited on a titanium foil of 32 cm2 area.  Californium has also been used to produce other transuranium elements; for example, lawrencium was first synthesized in 1961 by bombarding californium with boron nuclei.

Precautions 
Californium that bioaccumulates in skeletal tissue releases radiation that disrupts the body's ability to form red blood cells. The element plays no natural biological role in any organism due to its intense radioactivity and low concentration in the environment.

Californium can enter the body from ingesting contaminated food or drinks or by breathing air with suspended particles of the element. Once in the body, only 0.05% of the californium will reach the bloodstream. About 65% of that californium will be deposited in the skeleton, 25% in the liver, and the rest in other organs, or excreted, mainly in urine. Half of the californium deposited in the skeleton and liver are gone in 50 and 20 years, respectively. Californium in the skeleton adheres to bone surfaces before slowly migrating throughout the bone.

The element is most dangerous if taken into the body. In addition, californium-249 and californium-251 can cause tissue damage externally, through gamma ray emission. Ionizing radiation emitted by californium on bone and in the liver can cause cancer.

Notes

References

Bibliography

External links 

 Californium at The Periodic Table of Videos (University of Nottingham)
 NuclearWeaponArchive.org – Californium
 Hazardous Substances Databank – Californium, Radioactive

 
Chemical elements
Chemical elements with double hexagonal close-packed structure
Actinides
Synthetic elements
Neutron sources
Ferromagnetic materials